Cornelis Witthoefft (born 1964 in Hamburg) is a conductor and vocal coach, who was appointed professor of Lied (Art Song) at the State University of Music and Performing Arts Stuttgart (Musikhochschule Stuttgart, Germany) in 2004.

He has worked at major opera houses in Europe such as the Opéra de la Bastille, Paris, (France), the Flemish Opera, Antwerp, (Belgium), the Teatro di San Carlo, Naples, the Teatro Massimo, Palermo, (Italy), and the Salzburg Festival (Austria) as well as the New National Theatre Tokyo, (Japan).

He has also appeared as a solo pianist, chamber musician and accompanist, (with a repertoire of some fifty song recital programs), in Europe and overseas including Japan where he also held master classes on German lieder.

References

1964 births
Living people
German music educators
German male conductors (music)
Vocal coaches
German pianists
Musicians from Hamburg
Academic staff of the State University of Music and Performing Arts Stuttgart
21st-century German conductors (music)
21st-century pianists
21st-century German male musicians